John Malchase David Shalikashvili (June 27, 1936 – July 23, 2011) was a United States Army general who served as Supreme Allied Commander Europe from 1992 to 1993 and the 13th chairman of the Joint Chiefs of Staff from 1993 to 1997. He was born in Warsaw, Poland, in the family of émigré Georgian officer Dimitri Shalikashvili and his Polish wife Maria Rüdiger-Belyaeva. In 1996, he was the first recipient of the Naval War College Distinguished Graduate Leadership Award.

Shalikashvili was the first foreign-born man to become Chairman of the Joint Chiefs of Staff. He served in every level of unit command from platoon to division. Shalikashvili died of a stroke in 2011 at the age of 75.

Early life and education
Shalikashvili was a scion of the medieval Georgian noble house of Shalikashvili. His father, Prince Dimitri Shalikashvili (1896–1978), born in Gurjaani, served in the army of Imperial Russia and his wife, Countess Maria Rüdiger-Belyaeva. Dimitri was a grandson of Russian general Dmitry Staroselsky. 

After the Bolshevik Revolution, Dimitri became a lieutenant colonel in the army of the Democratic Republic of Georgia. When the Soviet Union invaded and occupied Georgia in 1921, Dimitri was on diplomatic service in Turkey. Dimitri then joined other Georgian exiles in Poland, where he met and married John's mother, Maria; she was Polish and of part German ancestry, and the daughter of Count Rudiger-Bielajew, a former Tsarist general. They had three children: Othar, John and Gale. Dimitri served in the Polish Army (along with other Georgian exiles) as a contract officer.

In 1939, the elder Shalikashvili fought against the German invasion of Poland. After the Polish defeat, Dimitri was demobilized. In 1941, he enlisted in the Georgian Legion, a force of ethnic Georgians recruited by Germany to fight against the Soviet Union. The unit was later incorporated into the SS-Waffengruppe Georgien and transferred to Normandy. Dimitri surrendered to British forces and was a prisoner of war until after the war. A collection of Dimitri Shalikashvili's writings are on deposit at the Hoover Institution.
Meanwhile, Maria, John and his two brothers lived through the destruction of Warsaw. As the Red Army approached Warsaw in 1944, the family fled to Pappenheim, Germany, being reunited with Dimitri along the way. It was in Pappenheim in the closing days of World War II that John first laid eyes on U.S. soldiers.  His family stayed with relatives there in Pappenheim for eight years.

In 1952, when Shalikashvili was 16, the family emigrated to the US, and settled in Peoria, Illinois. They were sponsored by Winifred Luthy, the wife of a local banker, who was previously married to Dimitri's cousin. The Luthys and the Episcopal Church helped the Shalikashvili family get started, finding jobs and a home for them. Dimitri worked for Ameren, and Maria was a file clerk at Commercial National Bank. When Shalikashvili arrived in Peoria he spoke little English:

Shalikashvili went to Peoria High School, where he was a long-distance runner. He attended Bradley University in Peoria and received a bachelor's degree in mechanical engineering in 1958. He was a member of Theta Chi. In 1970, Shalikashvili received a master's degree in international affairs from the George Washington University's School of International Affairs.

In May 1958, Shalikashvili and his family became U.S. citizens. It was the first nationality he ever held. He had previously been classified as stateless because he had been born to parents who had been refugees.

Military career

After graduation Shalikashvili had planned to work for Hyster, but received a draft notice in July 1958. He entered the United States Army as a private, enjoyed it, and applied to the Army's Officer Candidate School. He was commissioned as a second lieutenant in 1959.

Shalikashvili served in various Field Artillery and Air Defense Artillery positions as a platoon leader, forward observer, instructor, and student, in various staff positions, and as a battery commander. He served in the Vietnam War in Quang Tri Province with Advisory Team 4 (redesignated Team 19 in September, 1968), Military Assistance Command, Vietnam (MACV), as a senior district advisor from 1968 to 1969.  He was awarded a Bronze Star Medal with "V" for heroism during his Vietnam tour. Immediately after his Vietnam service, he attended the Naval War College in Newport, Rhode Island.

In 1970, Shalikashvili became executive officer of the 2nd Battalion, 18th Field Artillery at Fort Lewis, Washington. Later in 1975, he commanded the 1st Battalion, 84th Field Artillery, 9th Infantry Division at Fort Lewis. In 1977, he attended the U.S. Army War College and served as the Commander of Division Artillery (DIVARTY) for the 1st Armored Division in Germany. He later became the assistant division commander. In 1987, Shalikashvili commanded the 9th Infantry Division at Fort Lewis. There he oversaw a "high technology test bed" tasked to integrate three brigades—one heavy armor, one light infantry, and one "experimental mechanized"—into a new type of fighting force.

Shalikashvili achieved real distinction with his considerable success as the commander of Operation Provide Comfort, the peacekeeping and humanitarian activity in northern Iraq after the Gulf War. This assignment involved intense and complex negotiations with the Turkish government, and tough face-to-face meetings with the Iraqi military. Another important achievement was the establishment of the Joint Vision 2010 program, which would transfer the United States military into one great and effective digitalized military force.

Shalikashvili was appointed Chairman of the Joint Chiefs of Staff in 1993 by President Bill Clinton, effective October 25.  During the 1995-96 Third Taiwan Strait Crisis, commanded the US Navy to assist in the defense of Taiwan.
He retired from the Army in September 1997, after serving for 38 years.

Later life and death

Shalikashvili was an advisor to John Kerry's 2004 Presidential campaign. He was a visiting professor at the Center for International Security and Cooperation at Stanford University. He served as a director of Russell Investments, L-3 Communications, Inc., Plug Power Inc., United Defense, Inc., the Initiative for Global Development, and the National Bureau of Asian Research.

Shalikashvili was married to Joan and had one son, Brant, a graduate of Washington State University, and a daughter, Debra.

Shalikashvili suffered a severe stroke on August 7, 2004 that paralyzed his left side.

In 2006 the National Bureau of Asian Research (NBR) launched the John M. Shalikashvili Chair in National Security Studies to recognize Shalikashvili for his years of military service and for his leadership on NBR's Board of Directors.

In 2007, Shalikashvili penned an op-ed in The New York Times calling for a reversal of Don't ask, don't tell. A similar op-ed by him appeared in the June 19, 2009, issue of The Washington Post. The policy was reversed July 22, 2011, the day before his death.

Shalikashvili died at the age of 75 on July 23, 2011, at the Madigan Army Medical Center in Joint Base Lewis-McChord, Washington, from a stroke. He is buried at Arlington National Cemetery in Virginia.

The first biography on Shalikashvili, "Boy on the Bridge: The Story of John Shalikashvili's American Success," was published by the University Press of Kentucky in conjunction with the Association of the U.S. Army in October 2019.

Ancestry

Dates of rank

Awards and decorations

GEN Shalikashvili received at least two more foreign awards.

Other Recognition
In 1994, Shalikashvili received the Golden Plate Award of the American Academy of Achievement.

In 2006, The National Bureau of Asian Research recognized board member General John M. Shalikashvili for his lifelong contributions to our nation and dedicated a chair in national security studies in his name, The John M. Shalikashvili Chair in National Security Studies.

References

External links

Shalikashvili calls for rethinking 'don't ask, don't tell'
Andrew Marble, "In Memoriam: How General John Shalikashvili 'Paid It Forward' to 500,000 Others," Joint Forces Quarterly 63 (October 2011), 4–5.
The Life and Legacy of Gen. John M. Shalikashvili, Q&A with Shali biographer Andrew Marble (August 2011)

Arlington National Cemetery

Chairmen of the Joint Chiefs of Staff
Joint Chiefs of Staff
Recipients of the Distinguished Service Medal (US Army)
Recipients of the Legion of Merit
Recipients of the Air Medal
Recipients of the Gallantry Cross (Vietnam)
Recipients of the Meritorious Service Decoration
Commanders of the Order of the White Lion
Grand Crosses of the Order of Merit of the Republic of Poland
United States Army generals
Nobility of Georgia (country)
United States Army personnel of the Vietnam War
NATO Supreme Allied Commanders
1936 births
2011 deaths
Eastern Orthodox Christians from the United States
20th-century people from Georgia (country)
People from Peoria, Illinois
Military personnel from Warsaw
People from Weißenburg-Gunzenhausen
People with acquired American citizenship
Naval War College alumni
Elliott School of International Affairs alumni
American people of Georgian (country) descent
American people of Russian descent
Recipients of the Defense Distinguished Service Medal
Polish emigrants to the United States
Polish people of Georgian descent
Presidential Medal of Freedom recipients
Burials at Arlington National Cemetery
Recipients of the Humanitarian Service Medal
Recipients of the Order of Military Merit (Brazil)